Kill the Messenger, Keep the Message is the sixth studio album, and third LP, recorded by the indie rock band, Before Braille. It was released in 2009 by Sunset Alliance.

History

Before Braille originally started working on this record in 2003.  However, after releasing Tired of Not Being Away From Here, the band took an unexpected hiatus (i.e., it broke up). Consequently, work on its last album took much longer than previously planned, lasting up to five years while being recorded over multiple sessions. Preparations to finally put the record into a marketable condition did not finally begin in earnest until December 2007.

This was a highly anticipated record as the band told its fans about it for many years prior to its release. David Jensen describes the album as musically somewhere right between former efforts Cattle Punching on a Jack Rabbit and The Rumor and credits Led Zeppelin for the sound that the band essayed to reproduce with its guitars and drums.  Furthermore, the members of the band described this as the best material that they had ever recorded.

Among the notable songs on the album include:
 "Wolves in Wolves' Clothing," which was inspired by the head of A&R at Aezra Records. This song was played regularly on Before Braille's early tours and it was the first time that Jared Woosley contributed vocals to a Before Braille song since "Twenty-four minus Eighteen" on The Rumor.
 "Debutant Stomp" was originally recorded in 2003. However, it took a while for singer David Jensen to figure out how to track vocals around a song so inspired by Rajiv Patel's guitar-noodling style.

With the demise of Before Braille having so recently occurred, a message was left in the artwork of this record's booklet, apparently addressing many of the problems that ultimately led to the band's end.

Album Information

This album was recorded and produced at Flying Blanket Recording by Bob Hoag in 2003, 2004, 2007, and 2008. Before Braille members appearing on the record include: David Jensen, Brandon Smith, Rajiv Patel, Hans Ringger, and Kelly Reed. Also appearing on the record are Jared Woosley of Fivespeed, lending vocals to the song Wolves in Wolves' Clothing; Paul Jensen, lending vocals to the song Start Dictation/End Transmission; and Jason Corman (a.k.a. Mr. Fantastical), playing guitar on two songs and also lending vocals.

The artwork and design for this record was done by Jason Byron Nelson and was inspired by his original design, "Flowers in the Attic."

Reception

Although it was "quietly" released following Before Braille's break-up, Kill the Messenger, Keep the Message has nevertheless received positive reviews.  For example, Music Snobs Anonymous lists Kill the Messenger, Keep the Message as number 74 among the best albums of the 2000s. In addition, while reviewing Kill the Messenger, Keep the Message, Josh Macala at Raised by Gypsies found that Before Braille "had this quality that made them stand out," before concluding that "it is rare to find a band that can rock this hard and also make this much noise lyrically."

Track listing

References

External links
 Before Braille
 Sunset Alliance

2009 albums
Before Braille albums
Sunset Alliance Records albums